The gymnastics competition at the 2014 Central American and Caribbean Games was held in Veracruz, Mexico, from 16 to 26 November 2014 at the Veracruz Arena.

Medal summary

Artistic gymnastics

Men's events

Women's events

Rhythmic gymnastics

Trampoline gymnastics

Medal table

References

External links
 

2014 Central American and Caribbean Games events
2014 in gymnastics
Gymnastics at the Central American and Caribbean Games